In June 2018, Wales played a two-test series against Argentina as part of the 2018 June rugby union tests. It was Wales's first test series against Argentina since their 2006 tour. Ahead of the test series, Wales played South Africa in a one-off test match in Washington, D.C.

Fixtures

Squads
Note: Ages, caps and clubs are as per 9 June, the first test match of the tour.

Wales
On 8 May, head coach Warren Gatland named a 31-man squad for the 2018 Summer Internationals.

On 16 May, Luke Charteris, Tomas Francis and Josh Adams were forced to pull out of the squad due to selection protocols, while Josh Navidi withdrew due to injury. Ashton Hewitt, Rhodri Jones and Aaron Wainwright were called up in their places.

On 27 May, Aaron Shingler and Ashton Hewitt withdrew from the squad due to injury. Josh Turnbull was called up as a replacement.

On 3 June, Steff Evans withdrew from the squad due to injury. Josh Adams and Tomas Francis were recalled to the squad in his place.

Coaching team:
 Head coach:  Warren Gatland
 Backs/Attack coach:  Rob Howley
 Forwards coach:  Robin McBryde
 Defence coach:  Shaun Edwards

 ‡ – Denotes dual contracted players.

Argentina
Argentina 30-man squad for their 2018 June rugby union tests against Wales and Scotland.

Coaching team:
 Head coach:  Daniel Hourcade
 Defence coach:  Pablo Bouza
 Backs coach:  Germán Fernández
 Forwards coach:  Emiliano Bergamaschi

Matches

Warm-up match 

Notes:
 Tomos Williams (Wales) and Robert du Preez, Thomas du Toit, André Esterhuizen, Travis Ismaiel, Jason Jenkins, Makazole Mapimpi, Ox Nché, Sikhumbuzo Notshe, Marvin Orie, Embrose Papier, Kwagga Smith, Akker van der Merwe and Ivan van Zyl (all South Africa) made their international debuts.
 This victory saw Wales record a record third consecutive win against the Springboks, and win for the first time away from home.

First test

Notes:
 Javier Díaz, Bautista Delguy, Santiago Medrano (all Argentina) and Aaron Wainwright (Wales) made their international debuts.
 This was Wales' first victory over Argentina in Argentina since their 35–20 win in 2004.

Second test

Notes:
 This win saw Wales claim their first series victory over Argentina since 1999.

See also
 2018 June rugby union tests
 History of rugby union matches between Argentina and Wales
 History of rugby union matches between South Africa and Wales

Notes

2018 rugby union tours
tour
Wales national rugby union team tours
2018 in Argentine rugby union
2018
2018
History of rugby union matches between Argentina and Wales